The 1989 All-Ireland Under-21 Football Championship was the 26th staging of the All-Ireland Under-21 Football Championship since its establishment by the Gaelic Athletic Association in 1964.

Offaly entered the championship as defending champions, however, they were defeated by Kildare in a replay of the Leinster semi-final.

On 21 May 1989, Cork won the championship following a 2-8 to 1-10 defeat of Galway in the All-Ireland final. This was their eighth All-Ireland title overall and their first in three championship seasons.

All-Ireland Under-21 Football Championship

All-Ireland final

References

1989
All-Ireland Under-21 Football Championship